Angus Fraser McDonald (26 October 1890 – 20 October 1953) was an Australian rules footballer who played for the St Kilda Football Club in the Victorian Football League (VFL).

Notes

External links 

1890 births
1953 deaths
Australian rules footballers from Victoria (Australia)
St Kilda Football Club players
Port Melbourne Football Club players